Siah Afshar (also Romanized as Sīāh Afshār; also known as Seyāfshād, Sīā Afshār, and Sīāfshū) is a village in Garkan-e Shomali Rural District, Pir Bakran District, Falavarjan County, Isfahan Province, Iran. At the 2006 census, its population was 1,261, in 353 families.

References 

Populated places in Falavarjan County